The 32nd Goya Awards were presented at the Madrid Marriott Auditorium Hotel in Madrid on 3 February 2018, to honour the best in Spanish films of 2017. Joaquín Reyes and Ernesto Sevilla hosted the awards ceremony.

Nominations were announced on 13 December 2017 by David Verdaguer and Bárbara Lennie. Giant received the most nominations with thirteen, followed by The Bookshop with twelve nominations.

The Bookshop won Best Film, as well as Best Director and Best Adapted Screenplay, but Giant won the most awards, with ten awards, including Best Original Screenplay.

Winners and nominees
The winners and nominees are listed as follows:

Major awards

Other award nominees

Honorary Goya
Marisa Paredes

Films by number of nominations and awards

Controversy
The fashion designer David Delfín, who died on 3 June 2017, and the actress Amparo Pacheco, who died on 27 April 2017, were not included in the In Memoriam section of the ceremony, which was protested by some of their relatives.

References

External links
Official site

32
2017 film awards
2017 in Spanish cinema
2018 in Madrid
February 2018 events in Spain